Crispin Rodriguez Daluz (15 August 1935 – 12 February 2009) was a Filipino actor and reporter.

He is known for Himala (1982), Sukob (2006) and Bagong Buwan (2001). He died on February 12, 2009, in Olongapo City, Luzon, Philippines.

Daluz was the vice president for broadcast by Sports Communicators Organization of the Philippines (SCOOP) in 2001. He was also inducted as secretary of the Katipunan ng Artistang Pilipino sa Pelikula at Telebisyon in 2000.

Selected filmography
 1982 Himala as Igme
 1990 Michael and Madonna as Michael's Father 
 1992 Mukhang Bungo: Da Coconut Nut as Kikoy Ortega
 1994 Megamol as Reporter 
 1996 Masamang Damo
 1997 Behind Enemy Lines as Dr. Liu
 1998 Kasangga Kahit Kailan 
 2001 Bagong Buwan as Imam 
 2001 Sanggano't Sanggago as Tatang  
 2002 Lapu-Lapu as Father of Katulanga
 2004 All My Life as Mang Gene
 2004 Spirit of the Glass 
 2006 Sukob as Dante
 2006 Pamahiin as Mang Sebring

References

1935 births
2009 deaths
20th-century Filipino male actors
21st-century Filipino male actors